The All-Pac-12 men's basketball team is an annual Pac-12 Conference honor bestowed on the best players in the conference following every college basketball season. Pac-12 coaches select a 10-player first team and a five-player second team. There were two five-man teams from 1956 though 1979, followed by one 10-man first team from 1980 through 2008. For one year in 2008, there were three five-man teams selected.

During the final week of the regular season, Pac-12 coaches nominate up to three players from their team to be placed on the ballot for consideration. Coaches submit their votes by the Sunday after the season ends and cannot vote for their own players. Previously, a player needed to be selected on 50 percent of the ballots to be on the team. In the 2006–07 season, only nine players received enough votes to be selected. Ties resulted in extra players being selected in some seasons. Each team member receives an award. Players who are not placed on the first or second teams, but received at least three votes, earn honorable mention. The Pac-12 staff has the right to add to the list of recipients selected by the coaches for recognition.

The Pac-12, as currently chartered, was formed in 1959. However, the league claims the history of the Pacific Coast Conference (PCC), founded in 1915, as its own. After the collapse of the PCC in 1959, five of its members immediately founded the Athletic Association of Western Universities (AAWU). By 1964, all of the final PCC members except Idaho were reunited in the AAWU. The AAWU unofficially used the names Big Five, Big Six, and Pacific-8 before formally adopting the "Pacific-8" name in 1968. The name changed to Pacific-10 when Arizona and Arizona State joined in 1978, and to Pac-12 when Colorado and Utah joined in 2011.

Selections

1916–1919

1920–1929

1930–1939

1940–1949

1950–1959

1960–1969

1970–1979

1980–1989

1990–1999

2000–2009

2010–2019

2020–present

See also
List of All-Pac-12 Conference women's basketball teams

Notes

References

External links
All-Pac-12 Conference Winner at Sports-Reference.com

All-Pac-12
Lists of college men's basketball players in the United States
All-Pac-12